"Pinetop's Boogie Woogie" is a song initially recorded on December 29, 1928 in Chicago, Illinois, United States. It was released on March 1, 1929 by Clarence "Pinetop" Smith on Vocalion Records, a piano rag that cemented boogie-woogie as the name of its entire genre, which eventually evolved into rock and roll. Along with "Crazy About My Baby", "Pinetop's Boogie Woogie" is sometimes cited as "the first rock and roll song", being an early instance of a danceable 12 bar blues with backbeat.

Song
This recording was made in 1928, and its lyrics are exclusively instructions to dancers in the audience, as was traditional at the time. Musically, it is strikingly similar to the previous year's hit, "Honky Tonk Train Blues", by Meade Lux Lewis, which like "Pinetop's Boogie Woogie" went on to become a standard recorded many times by many artists. This may not be a coincidence, as around that time Lewis and Smith lived in the same boarding house.

Other recordings
This song became a "standard", recorded by many other artists. Most noteworthy may be the 1953 version of Joe Perkins, who became so famous for it that he acquired the nickname Pinetop Perkins.

Other versions were recorded by: Willie McTell (1949), Louis Jordan (1950), Tommy Dorsey (1943), Lionel Hampton (1946) — a rare version that actually included Pinetop's original instructions, Meade Lux Lewis (1951) — ironic given his influence on Pinetop's original version 23 years earlier, plus a version by Memphis Slim, backed by Willie Dixon, and Armand "Jump"  Jackson, where the announcer credited Pinetop as "the creator of rock and roll" (1962).

Jimmy Wakely recorded a song called "Pine Top's Boogie" in 1955, that was essentially a song about the song itself. This, too, was repeatedly covered, as by Jo Stafford in 1959.

References

Boogie-woogie songs
1928 songs
1929 singles
Songs about blues
Songs about jazz
American rock-and-roll songs